The 2012–13 Basketligan season was the 20th season of the Basketligan. Twelve teams participated and Södertälje Kings eventually won the Swedish championship.

Regular season

1Teams were awarded 2 points for a win, 0 for a loss.

Playoffs

Awards
Most Valuable Player:  Toni Bizaca (Södertälje Kings)
Finals MVP:  John Roberson (Södertälje Kings)
Rookie of the Year:  Mathias Liljeqvist (KFUM Nässjö)
Defender of the Year:  Hlynur Baeringsson (Sundsvall Dragons)
Guard of the Year:  James Miller (Borås Basket)
Forward of the Year:  Kodi Augustus (08 Stockholm Human Rights)
Center of the Year:  Keith Wright (Uppsala Basket)

References

Basketligan seasons
Sweden
Basketligan